Paheli is a 2005 Indian Hindi-language fantasy film. It is a remake of the 1973 Hindi movie Duvidha by Mani Kaul based on the short story written by Vijayadan Detha in Rajasthani. It was also reported to have been partially inspired by the 1997 Kannada movie Nagamandala based on the play of same name by Girish Karnad. Directed by Amol Palekar and produced by Juhi Chawla, Aziz Mirza, Sanjiv Chawla and Shah Rukh Khan, who also plays the male lead, the film tells the story of a wife (Rani Mukerji) whose husband (Khan) goes on a business trip as it is a part of business practices, and visited by a Jinn, disguised as her husband, who is in love with her and takes her husband's place. Detha's story which had earlier been adapted into the 1973 film by Mani Kaul is folkloric in origin. Though Paheli diverges from its source material and the earlier adaptations in giving the plot and its lead female character a more feminist agency.

Paheli opened the 9th Zimbabwe International Film Festival at the Libertie Cinema Complex in Harare. It was also screened at both the Sundance Film Festival and the Palm Springs International Film Festival. The working title of the movie was Ghost Ka Dost (translates to Friend of a Ghost). Paheli was India's official entry to the 79th Academy Awards.

Paheli released on 24 June 2005, and proved to be a moderate commercial success at the box office, grossing ₹32 crore worldwide. It received mixed-to-positive reviews from critics upon release, with praise for its production design, cinematography, costumes and special effects; however its story and screenplay received criticism.

At the 51st Filmfare Awards, Paheli received 2 nominations – Best Lyricist (Gulzar for "Dheere Jalna") and Best Male Playback Singer (Sonu Nigam for "Dheere Jalna"). At the 53rd National Film Awards, the film won Best Female Playback Singer (Shreya Ghoshal  for "Dheere Jalna").

Plot 
The movie is narrated by two puppets, voiced by Naseeruddin Shah and Ratna Pathak Shah.

A young enthusiastic Rajasthani village girl, Lachchi is married off to Kishan, the son of the rich merchant Bhanwarlal, from a distant village. While travelling from her home to her in laws' home, which is too far away, the party stops in the middle of the trip to rest at a dharamshala (spiritual dwelling), where a ghost sees Lachchi, and falls in love with her. Later that night, it is revealed that Kishan, who is a dutiful son, will honor his father's wish to start a new, far-away business on a predetermined auspicious date, which happens to be the very next day. Kishan turns away from his wife at night, to finish his bookkeeping, and in the early morning hours sets off on a business trip that is to last five years. Lachchi is devastated; Gajrobai, her husband's sister-in-law, consoles her, empathizing on the grounds that Gajrobai's husband Sunderlal has also disappeared. The next day, the ghost appears in Bhanwarlal's house, having taken Kishan's shape and voice because of his own attachment to Lachchi.

Despite of pretending to be Kishan in front of everyone else in the house, the ghost reveals his true identity to Lachchi at night.  Lachchi is thus presented with a dilemma between the representation of all of her desires in the form of the ghost who has taken the form of her real husband. She takes this newfound, sensual, magical, social, self-confident version of Kishan as hers. As Kishan, the ghost befriends all of the real Kishan's family and keeps Bhanwarlal happy by providing him with magical, possibly illusory, gold coins. His only blunder is in his treatment of the messenger Bhoja, who is perplexed by the idea that Kishan has sent a letter from his business trip only to receive it himself in his own house and offended when the ghost (who appears as Kishan) does not offer him a drink of water. Lachchi and the ghost lives blissfully together for four years, during which he also keeps her in-laws happy and solves many problems of the family and the village. Lachchi then, becomes pregnant with the ghost's child, and the real Kishan returns to see if the rumours about his wife's pregnancy are true. He returns to find the ghost in his (Kishan's) own form at the same time that Lachchi goes into early labor. Lachchi gives birth to a daughter, Lunima. Kishan's family is unable to determine which of the doppelgangers is the real Kishan (the ghost refusing to confess). They decide to visit the king so that he can arbitrate. In the meantime, Sundarlal also returns home and apologizes to Gajrobai for his sudden disappearance for so long and reunites with his family.

On the way to the king they meet an old shepherd, Gadariya who helps them out. He gives three tests in front of the real Kishan. He says the one who can pick up hot coals will prove himself as Bhanwalal's real son, the one who can gather the sheep in time will prove himself as the real husband of the bride, and the one who can enter his water-bottle will prove himself as the real lover of the bride. Kishan tries his best to perform the first two, which the ghost does not even bother to try. When the shepherd says 'the real lover of the bride', the ghost performs the third, impossible feat and enters the water bottle, simply to prove his love for Lachchi.  Thus, the real Kishan is found out. The shepherd quickly closes his bottle so the ghost cannot come out of it. Following this revelation, the real Kishan throws away the bottle in the middle of the desert, and everyone returns home. Lachchi is devastated over the loss of the ghost. 

In the very end, it is revealed that the ghost has escaped the bottle and taken control of Kishan's body to live with her. While Lachchi tries to confess to her husband that the ghost had not actually fooled her, the ghost exposes his identity to Lachchi by reminding her of the name they were originally going to give their daughter. Thus, Lachchi starts living happily with both her real husband and her ghost lover in the same body. The puppets end the story, remarking that this is a very old folk tale.

Cast 
Shah Rukh Khan as Kishanlal / Prem - The Ghost (dual role)
Rani Mukerji as Lachchi
Anupam Kher as Bhanwarlal, Kishan's father
Aditi Govitrikar as Kamli
Rajpal Yadav as Bhoja
Dilip Prabhavalkar as Kanwarlal, Bhanwarlal's brother
 Sharvari Jamenis as Rakhma, Kishanlal's sister
Palak Jain as Anusuya, Kishan's cousin (Child artist)
A. K. Hangal as Jeevraj
Naseeruddin Shah as Male puppet (voice)
Ratna Pathak Shah as Female puppet (voice)
Amitabh Bachchan as Gadariya (special appearance)
Juhi Chawla as Gajrobai (special appearance)
Suniel Shetty as Sunder Laal, Kishan's brother (special appearance)
Aasif Sheikh as Ghost

Production 
In 2004, Palekar went to Shah Rukh Khan with a request for a hearing. After listening to the script, Khan asked Palekar if he could produce it as well as star in it. According to Khan, Paheli is a woman's liberation film that deals with the issues of marriage and asks whether a woman must stay with a man only due to marriage and not out of love. Paheli was shot entirely in Rajasthan (Jhunjhunu district) over a period of 45 days. A scene involving Bachchan and Khan in the desert was shot in Mumbai on a helipad. One of the scenes was filmed at the Hadi Rani Kund (often confused with Chand Baori) of Todaraisingh.

Reception

Critical reception 
Paheli was submitted as India's official entry to the 79th Academy Awards.

Taran Adarsh from Bollywood Hungama gave it 4/5 stars and said: "On the whole, Paheli is one of the finest films produced in recent times. A film like this proves yet again that we don't need to seek inspiration from outsiders [read Hollywood], when Indian literature is rich enough to provide us with captivating stories." Raja Sen from Rediff.com called it "A breathtaking dream!", and said: "First things first, this is the best-looking Indian film in a very long time, and ranks up there with the finest ever. Palekar has crafted a delectable fairytale that is incredibly well-shot. Ravi K. Chandran's cinematography is spellbinding as he casts us into the fabulous sandscapes of Rajasthan with fluid harmony. Each frame of the film is picture-perfect, marinated in intoxicating colour. Watching Paheli is quite an experience, and it's from the very opening shot of the film that its sheer, magical palette overwhelms us." It was featured in The Ten Best Indian Films of 2005 list by Rediff.com, ranked third.

Box office 
Paheli saw 90% occupancy during its opening. It was declared an "average " in India, but a "hit" abroad. It proved to be a safe and profitable venture for its distributors.

Soundtrack 

The film's soundtrack is composed and produced by M. M. Kreem with lyrics by Gulzar. The soundtrack for the film released on 9 May 2005. The song "Dheere Jalna" is based on "Nadira Dhinna" from Okariki Okaru (2003).
Track listing

 Music Label – T-Series

Awards 
Paheli received several awards and nominations at multiple award ceremonies.

References 
 Paheliyan With Answers

External links 

Red Chillies Entertainment films
2005 films
Indian ghost films
2000s Hindi-language films
2000s romantic fantasy films
2000s fantasy drama films
2000s ghost films
Films scored by M. M. Keeravani
Films set in Rajasthan
Films shot in Rajasthan
Indian fantasy drama films
Indian romantic fantasy films
Films directed by Amol Palekar
Films shot in Mandawa
Films based on short fiction
Films based on Indian folklore
2005 drama films